The Crompton Free Library is a historic library building in West Warwick, Rhode Island. The small single-story wood-frame building was constructed in 1876, with funding from local mill owners. It is an excellent local example of a small Stick style public structure.

Background
The building was listed on the National Register of Historic Places in 1978. It now serves as home to the Pawtuxet Valley Preservation and Historical Society.

See also
List of libraries in Rhode Island
National Register of Historic Places listings in Kent County, Rhode Island

References

External links
Pawtuxet Valley Preservation and Historic Society

Library buildings completed in 1876
Libraries on the National Register of Historic Places in Rhode Island
Buildings and structures in West Warwick, Rhode Island
Former library buildings in the United States
National Register of Historic Places in Kent County, Rhode Island
1876 establishments in Rhode Island